D-amino acid dehydrogenase (quinone) (DadA) is an enzyme with systematic name D-amino acid:quinone oxidoreductase (deaminating). This enzyme catalyses the following chemical reaction

 D-amino acid + H2O + quinone  2-oxo carboxylate + NH3 + quinol

This enzyme is iron-sulfur flavoprotein.

References

External links 
 

EC 1.4.5